John E. Norton was a Republican member of the Wisconsin State Assembly during the 1901 session. A native of Milwaukee, he represented the 15th District of Milwaukee County, Wisconsin.

References

External links
The Political Graveyard

Politicians from Milwaukee
Year of birth missing
Year of death missing
Republican Party members of the Wisconsin State Assembly